The Arfak Mountain tree frog (Litoria chloronota) is a species of frog in the subfamily Pelodryadinae. It is endemic to West Papua, Indonesia. Its natural habitats are subtropical or tropical moist montane forests, rivers, rural gardens, and heavily degraded former forest. The threats are not known and is thought to be locally protected and occurs in Arfak Mountains National Park.

References

Litoria
Amphibians of Western New Guinea
Amphibians described in 1911
Taxonomy articles created by Polbot